Brandon West (born September 8, 1987) is a Canadian football running back who is currently a free agent. He most recently played for the Saskatchewan Roughriders of the Canadian Football League whom he played with for 4 seasons after signing with the club on March 8, 2011. West played high school football at Camden County High School in Kingsland, Georgia where he set the individual career scoring record. He played college football at Western Michigan. West set numerous records, including 2 NCAA records for all-purpose yards and kick return yards. Brandon West was a 4 time college All-American from 2006 to 2009.

On February 1, 2017, West signed with the Bloomington Edge of Champions Indoor Football.

References

External links
Just Sports Stats
Saskatchewan Roughriders bio
Brandon West's Web Site

1987 births
Living people
American football running backs
American players of Canadian football
Canadian football running backs
People from Brunswick, Georgia
Saskatchewan Roughriders players
Western Michigan Broncos football players
Bloomington Edge players